Radio and Television Station of Shanghai (RTS), a Shanghai-based state media outlet, and its wholly owned subsidiary, Shanghai Media Group (SMG), represent one of China's largest state-owned media and cultural conglomerates, with the most complete portfolio of media and related businesses. The Oriental Pearl Media Company under SMG was the first cultural and media company in China to realize a market capitalization totaling more than ¥100 billion (US$15B) on the Shanghai Stock Exchange in 2015. By June 2015, SMG has more than ¥61B (US$10B) in assets and about 17,200 employees.

SMG's businesses span operations of radio and TV networks, signal transmission, newspapers and magazines, drama and film production and distribution, OTT and streaming, IPTV, online and console gaming, digital advertising, home shopping and e-commerce, financial data and information services, children's arts training, TV post-production services, live entertainment, tourism and cultural investments, etc.

History
Formed in 2001, SMG is the result of a merger between the People's Radio Station of Shanghai, East Radio Shanghai, Shanghai Television, and Oriental Television. It has 11 analogue TV channels, 90 digital paid cable TV channels, an internet TV service, plus 10 analogue and 19 digital radio services. The group also operates and owns five sports centres and 14 cultural art centres. According to a survey of AC Nielsen, eleven of the group's TV channels have achieved a market share of 76% during prime time in 2003.

In 2003 the group conducted a feasibility study with a view to set up a new English channel. It renamed its Shanghai Broadcasting Network to Dragon TV and moved that channel's best-known English program "News at Ten" to Shanghai Television Business Channel and Dragon TV. In January 2008, the Group launch a 24-hour English TV news channel, (ICS – International Channel Shanghai), the second in China after the state-own China Central Television's English channel (CCTV-9). The content of ICS News is distributed on mobile and internet platforms by US Company China Animation Partners, LLC.

English radio programming includes "Live It Up, Shanghai" broadcasts on the East Radio channel (792am and 89.9fm).

On 2 October the Group hosted special concert to mark the 20th anniversary of South Korea and China's diplomatic ties, with performers including along Kim Jang-hoon, Super Junior-M and EXO-K.

The Walt Disney Studios and Shanghai Media Group Pictures signed a movie development agreement, before 6 March 2014 announcement, in which Chinese themes would be incorporated into Disney branded movies.

Shanghai Media Group is the holding company of Yicai Global (China) (formerly known as China Business Network), which in addition to the TV channel also runs a magazine named CBN Weekly, a newspaper called CBN Paper, radio channel CBN Radio and a number of websites carrying the name. In 2015 Alibaba Group paid 1.2 billion yuan ($193.5 million) to Shanghai Media Group for 30% of CBN's stocks. In October 2020, the United States Department of State designated Yicai Global as a foreign mission of the Chinese government.

Television channels

Free channels

Pay channels

Radio stations
All Channels are using callsigns with a prefix of "Shanghai People's Radio Station"(Chinese: 上海人民广播电台), but most programmes of them has been produced by of SMG Radio Centre (Chinese: 东方广播中心) (a.k.a. Shanghai East Radio Company Limited, Chinese: 上海东方广播有限公司) since 2014.

Programmes
 Dwelling Narrowness
 We Got Married – a special Valentine's Day Chinese version

Films
Kung Fu Panda 3 (2016)
Earth: One Amazing Day (2017)
 Born in China (2016) Along with Disneynature
 Kiangnan 1894 (2019)

References

External links

  
  

 
Mandarin-language radio stations
Radio stations in China
Chinese-language radio stations
Mass media in Shanghai
Chinese companies established in 2001
Mass media companies established in 2001
Television channels and stations established in 2001
Companies based in Shanghai
Government-owned companies of China